The Slovak mafia constitutes various organized crime groups in Slovakia, controlled primarily by Slovak interests. The Slovak mafia does not have significant international presence and, even in Slovakia, their activities are limited by boundaries set by the powerful Russian mafia, Ukrainian mafia and Chechen mafia and various Balkan groups controlling much of the heroin trade.

The Slovak mafia is especially active in security business, construction and ownership of restaurants and nightclubs. According to the United States Department of Defense "both indigenous and foreign organized crime groups are well established in Slovakia". Under Slovak law, the creation or support of an organized crime group constitutes a crime.

In its modern form, the mafia is a young phenomenon in Slovakia, having truly emerged only after the end of communism in 1989. According to known Slovak sociologist Pavol Haulik from the MVK poll agency, "We can state that people imagine that the mafia has a very strong influence in Slovakia". In 2005 a list of mafia members, families and 'special interest groups' suspected by the Slovak police leaked to the public, complete with lists of registered weapons and vehicles followed by two leaks of updated lists in 2011.

History 
In 1989, Czechoslovakia overthrew communism, and in 1993 the Czech Republic and Slovak Republic separated. In the first half of the 1990s, the issue of organized crime was underrated and legislature concerning the fight against it was inadequate. Crime rates in Slovakia soared in the 1990s, and the first post-communist gangsters emerged. At the time of the 1994-1998 Vladimír Mečiar's government, organized crime became well established in the country and it penetrated the highest political positions. An often cited example is the Slovak Secret Service under Ivan Lexa and his deputy Jaroslav Svěchota.

Description 
The areas traditionally under mafia control in Slovakia include the biggest cities (Bratislava, Banská Bystrica, Košice) and southern Slovakia. According to former Chief investigator Jaroslav Ivor, organized crime is more prevalent in areas with good economic background. Southern Slovakia is also close to the Slovak-Hungarian border which provides a safety mechanism. Traditional ties to the community in a given region are also important.

According to an anonymous investigator cited in Pravda (13.07.11, page 4), the political party which gets the Ministry of Interior for the election term gets to give out orders which mafia groups are to be let alone, and which groups will be put under pressure. According to the source it is possible to ascertain in each given time-frame which groups are avoided by the police and which groups are actively targeted by police raids and arrested. Besides the common overlap between policemen and organized crime associates, Slovak media routinely report on higher-ranking police officers having ties to the organized crime.

Mafia list leaks 
There have been three distinct mafia lists leaked to the public so far. All of them were authored by the Slovak police.

First mafia list 
The first mafia list appeared on the internet in 2005. Despite the name, it consists of several lists: the first contains names divided into several organized crime groups including dates of birth, addresses, gun license numbers and types of weapons. The second contains the names of "people of interest" including birth numbers, addresses and sometimes with a photograph. The third contains "vehicles of interest" including evidence numbers and the name of the driver or owner. The fourth contains bars or restaurants either owned or frequented by the mafia. It divides the Slovak mafia into the following groups: Takáčovci, Piťovci, Borbélyovci and Jakšíkovci.

For a long time, the Slovak police refused to acknowledge its truthfulness and it wasn't until January 2011 that police Chief Jaroslav Spišiak admitted that the mafia list was his idea to better fight against organized crime. "They were supposed to serve as an aid for patrolling policemen, so that they know who they are dealing with when conducting controls, to anticipate that they are dangerous", said Spišiak at that time.

It was immediately noted that numerous important figures of the Slovak mafia are missing from the list. Also, there are several mistakes present such as a member of the Takáčovci group being listed instead under Jakšíkovci.

Second mafia list 
The second mafia list, made in March 2010, was leaked to the Slovak media in September 2011. It contains 10 pages with the names of organized crime groups, names of members, birth numbers and addresses. It divides the Slovak mafia into the following groups: Piťovci, Jakšíkovci, Takáčovci, vlamači, autičkári, and defektári.

Third mafia list 
The third mafia list is the most detailed list so far, containing over 400 names and including also the photographs of all suspected mafia members. The list consists of names, addresses, birth numbers, used weapons, registered vehicles, employment information and telephone contacts. It divides the Slovak mafia into the following groups: bytová mafia (apartment mafia), Piťovci, Takáčovci, Sýkorovci, two distinct fractions of Jakšíkovci and group around Ján Z.

The third mafia list was leaked by a policewoman working at the Office of Combating Organized Crime (Úrad boja proti organizovanej kriminalite) who downloaded it on her USB flash drive and later into the notebook of another person. She would fail a polygraph test and later confessed to the deed. On October 10, 2011, she was charged with abusing her powers.

Hungarian Mafia ( Fundai Mafia)

Fundai mafia is the largest organized mafia group in Europe. It is the strongest mafia in power in Hungary. Fundai mafia main activities include trafficking and smuggling of narcotics, mainly heroin, people smuggling, extortion, kidnappings, contract killing, fraud & more. The fundai mafia is friends with more than 18+ mafia groups.

Today 
After arrests of many mob bosses in Slovakia, today it is said the Slovak mafia as it existed in the 1990s is gone. Most members of Mafia groups either got killed, are in prison or ran away. It is said to end in the early 2010s. The Murder of Ján Kuciak raised questions amongst the general public if the Mafia is still alive, because murders of investigative journalist are uncommon in Slovakia. Nowadays, the Mafia as it existed in the 1990s is said to be gone, however, there are speculations that it might exist in different forms. Many people claim that there are trucks going through villages that carry immigrants. It is also said that there are groups that give illegal immigrants jobs. Amongst these speculations, there are different speculations and theories. The black market however, mainly drug dealing, is big in Slovakia. There are many drug gangs that participate in illegal drug trade, money laundering etc. Every now and then, these groups are caught and publicised.

Notable groups 

 Černákovci - a family founded in Banská Bystrica, named after Mikuláš Černák. He was considered as the boss of all bosses after a war in Slovak underworld in 1997.
 Takáčovci - a family founded at the beginning of the 1990s by Ján Takáč. As of 2011, their roster includes the Greco-Roman wrestling trainer Karol L., former wrestler Mário R., karatist Slávo B., and ice hockey player Richard M.
 Sýkorovci - a family based in Bratislava, named after Miroslav Sýkora. On the first mafia list, the family is named Borbélyovci. In February 2009, the police arrested 10 members of the group, capo Martin B. narrowly escaped.

 Piťovci - a family founded in Lamač, Bratislava, named after Juraj Ondrejčák aka Piťo. They made extensive use of Mercedes G vehicles.
 Jakšíkovci - a family named after brothers Ivan and Libor Jakšík, who worked with the police in the 1990s and later owned a chain of bars. Ivan Jakšík had a company (LIKO) with Ivan Pokorný and lawyer Martin Bognár. Bognár was previously accused of creating contracts about protection with security companies attached to the Takáčovci family, an important part of the restaurant and bar racket. Both he and members of the Takáčovci group were released when the prosecutor unexpectedly dismissed the charges. They had legal troubles in May 2011 when Slovak police arrested 8 members on various charges.

See also 
 Crime in Slovakia

Notes

References

Sources 
 Pravda, 13.07.2011, No. 161, page 4, "Analysis: Whom helps the police"

Mafia
Organized crime by ethnic or national origin
Organized crime groups in Slovakia